The Javan caecilian (Ichthyophis javanicus) is a species of amphibian in the family Ichthyophiidae endemic to Indonesia. Its natural habitats are subtropical or tropical moist lowland forests, subtropical or tropical moist montane forests, rivers, intermittent rivers, plantations, rural gardens, heavily degraded former forests, irrigated land, and seasonally flooded agricultural land.

References

javanicus
Amphibians described in 1960
Amphibians of Indonesia
Taxonomy articles created by Polbot